Julien du Rhéart (13 March 1885 – 28 February 1963) was a French footballer. A midfielder, he played in three matches for the France national football team between 1906 and 1911.

References

External links
 

1885 births
1963 deaths
Place of birth missing
Association football midfielders
French footballers
France international footballers
Red Star F.C. players
Club Français players